Dubai International Academy is an international, private school. It is located in the Emirates Hills area of Dubai, United Arab Emirates. The school is part of the Innoventures Education group. Dubai International Academy opened its doors on September 10, 2005, with 500 students from 55 countries. Currently, it has over 2000 students, representing over 80 nationalities.

Dubai International Academy is accredited by the Council of International Schools, and the New England Association of Schools and Colleges.

History 
Founded in September 2005, Dubai International Academy opened with 500 students from 55 countries, and a faculty of 50 members from 18 nationalities. It was the first school in UAE to offer the IB curriculum to its pupils.

In September 2012, the school had 1800 students from 78 nationalities, and a faculty of 250 staff from 42 nationalities.

In March 2015, Dubai International Academy was rated Outstanding overall for the first time by KHDA, one of the 16 schools in Dubai to receive this rating, and only one of the 4 schools which offer the IB program in Dubai.

Curriculum 
Dubai International Academy follows the IB Curriculum, offering the Primary Years Program (PYP) for students aged 6–12, the Middle Years Program (MYP) for students aged 11–16, and the Diploma Program (DP) for students aged 16–19. The 4th IB Course - the Career Related Program, is also offered since 2018.

English, Math and Science remain mandatory throughout all 3 programs, and Language Acquisition (as Spanish or French in the MYP, with Self-Taught Language added in DP) is mandatory for all students taking part in the MYP and the DP programs.

During Year 11 (MYP 5 - the final year of MYP), students work towards an MYP Certificate, being externally assessed by the IB in all subject areas at the end of the year, as well as requiring the successful completion of the Personal Project, and the Inter Disciplinary Unit (IDU) by the students. Upon being awarded the certificate, the students may proceed on to the Diploma Program.

Extracurricular activities

Model United Nations 

Dubai International Academy is well known for its Model United Nations conference (known as DIAMUN). It is a THIMUN (The Hague International Model United Nations) affiliated conference. DIAMUN is the largest Model United Nations conference in the United Arab Emirates, hosted annually, and involving participants from both local and international schools. The 2015 conference has been attended by over 900 students, representing 53 schools in 17 countries, across 4 continents.

The Model United Nations club at DIA has been founded in 2008. As of December 2016, the MUN club has approximately 150 student participants.

Water for Life 
The Water for Life Club in Dubai Indian Academy is a subdivision of the Aqua Initiative, which aims to combat the problem of Water Scarcity. After the establishment of the Aqua Initiative, Dubai International Academy began to celebrate the World Water Day. During the celebration, various fundraising activities are organized, such as bake sales and the Water for Life Carnival.

Duke of Edinburgh International Award 
The Duke of Edinburgh International Award is a generic name for a youth awards program, initially founded in the United Kingdom in 1956. The awards recognize adolescents and young adults upon the completion of a series of self-improvement exercises. Dubai International Academy is participating in the program, offering its students all 3 progressive levels, with the Bronze award offered from 14 years of age, the Silver award offered from 15 years of age, and the Gold award offered to students who are 16 and above.

Sports  
As of January 2017, Basketball, Football, Cricket, Netball, Volleyball and Swimming teams are offered in the Dubai International Academy. All of those teams are offered at 4 age categories, which are the U12 (read as under-twelves), U14, U16 (sometimes referred to as Junior Varsity), and U18 (sometimes referred to as Varsity).

In 2016, new Aquathlon and Cross-Country teams have been added. , there is only one of each of these teams; the Aquathlon team offered for U10s and U11s, while the Cross Country team is offered for U8s through U11s. All sports teams in Dubai International Academy bear the name of "DIA Wolves".

Rating 
The Knowledge and Human Development Authority (KHDA) is the authority responsible for educational quality assurance in Dubai, United Arab Emirates. The schools are rated annually based on the quality of teaching and learning, with the ratings ranging from Unsatisfactory to Outstanding.

For the 2015/2016 rating, Dubai International Academy was rated Outstanding overall for the first time, one of the 16 schools in Dubai to receive this rating, and only one of the 4 schools which offer the IB program in Dubai.

See also 
 Education in the United Arab Emirates
 List of universities and colleges in the United Arab Emirates

References 

Schools in Dubai
International schools in the United Arab Emirates
International Baccalaureate schools in the United Arab Emirates